Vanguardia Moral de la Patria ('Moral Vanguard of the Fatherland') was a Panamanian political party led by Guillermo Endara, who had been the first president after the military rule ended in 1989. Endara had been a candidate in the 2004 elections for the Solidarity Party. After that, Endara created this new party, and stood as presidential candidate in 2009.

From 2007 to 2009 the party held a seat of the National Assembly, after the 2009 elections the party could not reach the minimum of votes required to exist and was disbanded. Endara died shortly thereafter.

Defunct political parties in Panama